The Frankfurt Group, also called the Frankfurt Gang or the Frankfurt Five, was a group of English-speaking composers and friends who studied composition under Iwan Knorr at the Hoch Conservatory in Frankfurt am Main in the late 1890s. The group included Balfour Gardiner, Norman O'Neill, Cyril Scott and Roger Quilter, who were all English, and Percy Grainger and Frederick Septimus Kelly, who were born in Australia but established themselves as composers in England. Although they did not study in Frankfurt all at the same time they remained close friends from their student days onwards.

Knorr, though German-born, was strongly influenced by Russian music and was a believer in fostering the individuality of his pupils. The Frankfurt group were united more by their friendship and their non-conformity than by any common aim, though they did share a dislike of Beethoven, and a resistance to the musical nationalism of the self-styled English Musical Renaissance of Hubert Parry and Charles Villiers Stanford, and of the later English Pastoral School of Ralph Vaughan Williams and Gustav Holst. All of them had a predilection for the music of Frederick Delius, although there remains some doubt as to when the individual members first became aware of his music, which was certainly later than when they were a group in the 1890s. The group was distinguished by its rebelliousness, and by studying abroad they stood apart from the conservative wider English musical establishment.

Grainger described the group as Pre-Raphaelite composers, arguing that they were musically distinguished from other British composers by "an excessive emotionality ... particularly a tragic or sentimental or wistful or pathetic emotionality", reached through a focus on chords rather than musical architecture or "the truly English qualities of grandeur, hopefulness and glory". Most rebellious were Grainger and Scott, whose music often crossed the boundaries of accepted musical convention. Scott's work for a time gave up the use of bars and time signatures, while employing dissonant harmonies and highly individual orchestration. The music of Quilter, O'Neill and (sometimes) Balfour Gardiner, shows an influence derived from Delius.

References

Literature 
 Peter Cahn, Das Hoch'sche Konservatorium in Frankfurt am Main (1878–1978), Frankfurt am Main: Kramer, 1979.
 
 
 

Culture in Frankfurt
Composition schools
English music
Music organisations based in Germany